George Ulick Browne, 6th Marquess of Sligo and 4th Earl of Clanricarde (1 September 1856 – 26 February 1935), styled Earl of Altamont until 1913, was an Irish peer.

George was the eldest son of Henry Browne, 5th Marquess of Sligo, and his wife Catherine Henrietta Dicken. He was born in Munger, British India. He succeeded to the marquessate in February 1913, aged 56, on the death of his father. He married Agatha Stewart Hodgson, daughter of James Stewart Hodgson, on 12 October 1887. They had three daughters and one son:

 Eileen Agatha Browne (1889–1940) — married James Stanhope, 7th Earl Stanhope
 Moya Melisende Browne (1892–1974)
 Doreen Geraldine Browne (1896–1979) — married Michael Knatchbull, 5th Baron Brabourne
 Ulick de Burgh Browne, 7th Marquess of Sligo (1898–1941)

Upon the 1916 death of Hubert de Burgh-Canning, 2nd Marquess of Clanricarde, the Marquess of Sligo also became Earl of Clanricarde. In 1921 he attended the first meeting of the short-lived Senate of Southern Ireland. In 1922 he was photographed by Walter Stoneman. 

In 1924 when visiting British Hong Kong, the Marquess of Sligo succeeded in getting a specimen of the South China giant salamander sent to London Zoo. The species was named Megalobatrachus sligoi in his honour; it is today called Andrias sligoi. He died in 1935 in London.

References

Further reading
 Burke's Irish Family Records, Hugh Montgomery-Massingberd, ed., 1976, p. 38.
 The Complete Peerage, volume XIV, 1998, p. 502.

External links
 

1856 births
1935 deaths
George
George
George
People from Munger district